Philippine legislative election, 1941 may refer to:
1941 Philippine House of Representatives elections
1941 Philippine Senate elections